Machen House is a country house in the hamlet of Lower Machen, to the west of the city of Newport, Wales. The house was built in 1831 for the Rev. Charles Augustus Morgan, vicar of Machen and scion of the Morgan family of  Tredegar House. In the mid-20th century, Machen was the home of the Conservative politician Peter Thorneycroft, when he sat as the Member of Parliament for Monmouth. Machen House is a Grade II* listed building. A bothy and a bee bole in the grounds of the house are both listed at Grade II. The house remains a private residence and is not open to the public.

History
Machen House was built in 1831 for the Rev. Charles Augustus Morgan, vicar of Machen and the younger brother of Charles Morgan, 1st Baron Tredegar. The Morgans lived on the Tredegar House estate, and were major landowners in South Wales.

In the mid-20th century, Machen was the home of Peter Thorneycroft, Conservative Member of Parliament for Monmouth, and Chancellor of the Exchequer in the government of Harold Macmillan. It remains a private residence and is not open to the public.

Architecture and description
Cadw notes the Georgian style of the house is supplemented by some Gothic features. Machen House is a Grade II* listed building.

The architectural historian John Newman, in his Gwent/Monmouthshire volume of the Pevsner Buildings of Wales series, writes that "much remains of the Rev. Morgan's elaborate grounds". The gardens also have a number of Gothic features, including castellated walls and the remains of a Chinese Willow pattern bridge, which crosses one of the two small lakes. They are listed at Grade II on the Cadw/ICOMOS Register of Parks and Gardens of Special Historic Interest in Wales.

A bothy and a bee bole in the grounds both have Grade II listings.

Notes

References

Sources
 

Grade II* listed buildings in Newport, Wales
Registered historic parks and gardens in Newport
Country houses in Wales
Grade II* listed houses